
Sławno County is a unit of territorial administration and local government (powiat) in West Pomeranian Voivodeship, north-western Poland, on the Baltic coast. It came into being on January 1, 1999, as a result of the Polish local government reforms passed in 1998.

As of 2006 its total population is 57,643, out of which the population of Darłowo is 14,380, that of Sławno is 13,314, and the rural population is 29,949.

Neighbouring counties
Sławno County is bordered by Słupsk County to the east and Koszalin County to the south-west. It also borders the Baltic Sea to the north-west.

Administrative division
The county is subdivided into six gminas (two urban and four rural). These are listed in the following table, in descending order of population.

References
Polish official population figures 2006

 
Land counties of West Pomeranian Voivodeship